The 2013–14 season was FK Vojvodina's 8th season in Serbian SuperLiga. This article shows player statistics and all matches (official and friendly) that the club played during the 2013–14 season.

Players

Squad information

Squad statistics

Matches

Serbian SuperLiga

Serbian Cup

UEFA Europa League

External links
 Official website 

FK Vojvodina seasons
Vojvodina
Vojvodina